The Parliamentary Union of the OIC Member States (PUIC, PUOICM) is composed of the parliaments of the member states of the Organisation of Islamic Cooperation (OIC). It was established in Iran on 17 June 1999, with its head office situated in Tehran.

Member states

Non-participating states

Observers

Secretary General 

The first Secretary General was Egyptian diplomat Mr. Ibrahim Ahmed Auf, who served for two term from 1 March 2000 to 30 April 2008. On 1 May 2008, Prof. Dr. Mahmud Erol KILIC from Turkey was appointed as the second Secretary General, who served two terms starting from 1 May 2008 to 31 July 2018. Mr. Cheikh Mouhamed Khouraichi Niass from Senegal is the Secretary General of the PUIC from 1 August, 2018. He was elected by the 13th PUIC Conference held In Tehran, Islamic Republic of Iran.

PUIC Standing Specialized Committees:

 Committee on Political and Foreign Relations;
 Committee on Economic Affairs and Environment;
 Committee on Human Rights, Women and Family Affairs;
 Committee on Cultural and Legal Affairs and Dialogue of Civilizations and Religions.
 Permanent Committee on Palestine

References

External links 
 

Organisation of Islamic Cooperation
Organizations established in 1999
1999 establishments in Iran